Sulcosinus is a genus of large sea snails or true whelks, marine gastropod molluscs in the superfamily Buccinoidea.

Species 
According to the World Register of Marine Species the following species with valid names are included within the genus Sulcosinus : 
 Sulcosinus taphrium (Dall, 1891)
Synonyms
 Sulcosinus orientalis Golikov & Gulbin, 1977: synonym of Clinopegma borealis Tiba, 1969

References

  Dall, W. H. (1895). Scientific results of exploration by the U. S. Fish Commission steamer "Albatross" XXXIV. Report on Mollusca and Brachiopoda dredged in deep water, chiefly near the Hawaiian Islands, with illustrations of hitherto unfigured species from northwest America. iProceedings of the United States National Museu. 17: 675-733, pls 23-32.

Buccinoidea